Robinsia is a genus of eels in the family Chlopsidae. The sole species is Robinsia catherinae, which inhabits tropical waters around Kenya in the western Indian Ocean, as well as off Panama and Brazil.

References

Eels
Chlopsidae
Monotypic fish genera